The Buena Vista Park Historic District in Tulsa, Oklahoma is a  historic district that was listed on the U.S. National Register of Historic Places (NRHP) in 2007.  Its 24 contributing buildings include Late 19th and 20th Century Revivals and Late 19th and Early 20th Century American Movements architecture, specifically Colonial Revival architecture, Prairie School, and Bungalow/Craftsman architecture. The period of significance is 1913-1933.

It comprises three blocks of the Buena Vista Park Addition, an area platted out in 1908. District boundaries are East 18th Street on the north, the rear lot lines of properties on the east side of South Cheyenne Avenue on the east, East 21st Street on the south and Riverside Drive/Carson Drive on the west.

It includes the James Alexander Veasey House at 1802 South Cheyenne Avenue West, which was already NRHP-listed "for its architectural significance as a local landmark example of the Colonial Revival style."

It was listed on the NRHP for its architecture.

It is near the Arkansas River.

See also
Brady Heights Historic District, also NRHP-listed in Tulsa

References

Historic districts on the National Register of Historic Places in Oklahoma
Residential buildings on the National Register of Historic Places in Oklahoma
Colonial Revival architecture in Oklahoma
Prairie School architecture in Oklahoma
American Craftsman architecture in Oklahoma
Bungalow architecture in Oklahoma
Geography of Tulsa, Oklahoma
National Register of Historic Places in Tulsa, Oklahoma